In the field of solid mechanics, torsion is the twisting of an object due to an applied torque. Torsion is expressed in either the pascal (Pa), an SI unit for newtons per square metre, or in pounds per square inch (psi) while torque is expressed in newton metres (N·m) or foot-pound force (ft·lbf). In sections perpendicular to the torque axis, the resultant shear stress in this section is perpendicular to the radius.

In non-circular cross-sections, twisting is accompanied by a distortion called warping, in which transverse sections do not remain plane. For shafts of uniform cross-section unrestrained against warping, the torsion is:

where:
 T is the applied torque or moment of torsion in Nm.
  (tau) is the maximum shear stress at the outer surface
 JT is the torsion constant for the section. For circular rods, and tubes with constant wall thickness, it is equal to the polar moment of inertia of the section, but for other shapes, or split sections, it can be much less. For more accuracy, finite element analysis (FEA) is the best method. Other calculation methods include membrane analogy and shear flow approximation.
 r is the perpendicular distance between the rotational axis and the farthest point in the section (at the outer surface).
 ℓ is the length of the object to or over which the torque is being applied.
 φ (phi) is the angle of twist in radians.
 G is the shear modulus, also called the modulus of rigidity, and is usually given in gigapascals (GPa), lbf/in2 (psi), or lbf/ft2 or in ISO units N/mm2.
 The product JTG is called the torsional rigidity wT.

Properties
The shear stress at a point within a shaft is:

Note that the highest shear stress occurs on the surface of the shaft, where the radius is maximum. High stresses at the surface may be compounded by stress concentrations such as rough spots. Thus, shafts for use in high torsion are polished to a fine surface finish to reduce the maximum stress in the shaft and increase their service life.

The angle of twist can be found by using:

Sample calculation

Calculation of the steam turbine shaft radius for a turboset:

Assumptions:
 Power carried by the shaft is 1000 MW; this is typical for a large nuclear power plant.
 Yield stress of the steel used to make the shaft (τyield) is: 250 × 106 N/m2.
 Electricity has a frequency of 50 Hz; this is the typical frequency in Europe. In North America, the frequency is 60 Hz. 

The angular frequency can be calculated with the following formula:

 

The torque carried by the shaft is related to the power by the following equation:

 

The angular frequency is therefore 314.16 rad/s and the torque 3.1831 × 106 N·m.

The maximal torque is:

 

After substitution of the torsion constant, the following expression is obtained:

 

The diameter is 40 cm. If one adds a factor of safety of 5 and re-calculates the radius with the maximum stress equal to the yield stress/5, the result is a diameter of 69 cm, the approximate size of a turboset shaft in a nuclear power plant.

Failure mode

The shear stress in the shaft may be resolved into principal stresses via Mohr's circle. If the shaft is loaded only in torsion, then one of the principal stresses will be in tension and the other in compression. These stresses are oriented at a 45-degree helical angle around the shaft. If the shaft is made of brittle material, then the shaft will fail by a crack initiating at the surface and propagating through to the core of the shaft, fracturing in a 45-degree angle helical shape. This is often demonstrated by twisting a piece of blackboard chalk between one's fingers.

In the case of thin hollow shafts, a twisting buckling mode can result from excessive torsional load, with wrinkles forming at 45° to the shaft axis.

See also
 List of area moments of inertia
 Saint-Venant's theorem
 Second moment of area
 Structural rigidity
 Torque tester
 Torsion siege engine
 Torsion spring or -bar
 Torsional vibration

References

External links 
 
 

Mechanics
Torque
Moment (physics)